Arnaud Lisembart (born 29 December 1984) is a French retired professional football player.

Previously, he played on the professional level in Ligue 2 for Le Mans and one season in Belgium with Oud-Heverlee Leuven in the Belgian Second Division. His other previous clubs include Cherbourg, Rodez, Sablé-sur-Sarthe and Rouen.

References

External links 
 

1984 births
Living people
French footballers
French expatriate footballers
Expatriate footballers in Belgium
Ligue 2 players
Le Mans FC players
Oud-Heverlee Leuven players
Challenger Pro League players
AS Cherbourg Football players
FC Rouen players
Rodez AF players
Footballers from Le Mans
Association football defenders